Chileotrecha is a monotypic genus of ammotrechid camel spiders, first described by Emilio Antonio Maury in 1987. Its single species, Chileotrecha atacamensis is distributed in Chile.

References 

Solifugae
Arachnid genera
Monotypic arachnid genera